The 4″/50 caliber gun (spoken "four-inch-fifty-caliber") was the standard low-angle, quick-firing gun for United States, first appearing on the monitor  and then used on "Flush Deck" destroyers through World War I and the 1920s. It was also the standard deck gun on S-class submarines, and was used to rearm numerous submarines built with  guns early in World War II. United States naval gun terminology indicates the gun fired a projectile  in diameter, and the barrel was 50 calibers long.

Design
The original 4-inch/50 caliber Mark 7 gun, M1898, serial nos. 213–254, 257–281, 316–338, was an entirely new high-power design built-up gun with a tube, jacket, hoop, locking ring and screw breech. Gun No. 213 had a liner. The gun was described as a  gun but with a 4-inch bore in the 1902 handbook, this indicated its higher power and also the fact the barrel was actually more the size of a 5-inch/40 caliber gun than a 4-inch gun. The ammunition was about  heavier than a 4-inch/40 caliber round. The Mod 1 was a Mod 0 that used a conical steel liner and the Mod 2 was either a Mod 0 or Mod 1 that was relined using a conical nickel-steel liner and a shoulder on the breech end.

Gun No. 353 was the prototype of the Mark 8 and was test fired on 22 September 1910. This gun had been ordered 16 June 1907 and delivered in November 1907. The simplified design of the Mark 8 had just a gun tube and jacket. The jacket extended all the way to the muzzle and ended in a muzzle bell. The production run was small with only 12 guns built, Nos. 353–364.

The Mark 9 was a design directly resulting from tests with gun No. 353. It was designed to be light in weight, and would go on to be the standard 4-inch gun used on destroyers and submarines during WW I. The gun would use an A tube, full-length jacket, a muzzle swell with a side swing Smith-Asbury breech mechanism and Welin breech block. Gun No. 365, the first Mark 9, was ordered from Midvale Steel on 18 October 1911. There were 390 Mark 9s built by four different manufacturers from 1911 until the US entered World War I in 1917. During the war another 1,885 guns were produced, with Root & VanDervoort, American Radiator Company and Poole Engineering joining the pre-war manufacturers. After the Armistice another 713 guns were produced, with orders for 3538 guns cancelled. It was decided after World War I that all destroyers would carry the 4-inch/50 caliber Mark 9 Mod 5 gun; the refits were completed in autumn 1921.

The Mark 10, gun No. 365-A, was ordered in 1915 but does not appear to have been completed until after WW I. The initial drawings were for a 4-inch/50 caliber anti-aircraft gun dated January and February 1915. It was designed with a vertically sliding breech block on a built-up gun with a tube, jacket, chase hoop and locking ring, all constructed of nickel steel, but it does not appear that the Mark 10 was put into service.

The gun was rapid firing (US term) or quick firing (British term). Useful life expectancy was 400–500 effective full charges (EFC) for a non-chrome plated barrel, while a chrome plated barrel was listed at 600 rounds.

Increasing awareness of the need for improved anti-aircraft protection resulted in the mounting of dual purpose guns on destroyers beginning in the 1930s.  The dual-purpose 5-inch/38 caliber gun became standard for United States destroyers constructed from the 1930s through World War II.  United States destroyers built with 4-inch/50 caliber low-angle guns were mostly rearmed with dual-purpose 3-inch/50 caliber guns during the war. The 4-inch/50 caliber guns removed from destroyers were mounted on Defensively Equipped Merchant Ships of the British Merchant Navy and United States Merchant Marine like . As S-boats were transferred from combat patrols to training duties from mid-1942 through 1943, their 4-inch guns were removed and used to re-equip front-line submarines built with 3-inch/50 caliber guns.

Manufacturer list Mark 9 gun

The unassigned numbers mostly corresponded to gun orders that were cancelled with the signing of the Armistice.

US Navy service
The 4″/50 caliber gun was mounted on:
 s (Mark 7)
 s
 s
 s
 s
 s
 s
 s
 s
 s
 The first seven s
 
 
 Some minesweepers - Q-ships like 
 Some minelayers like 
 armed yachts,

United States Merchant Marine
 Most Liberty ships
 World War I underway replenishment oilers like 
 Some World War II oilers like ,  and

Coast defense use
Four two-gun batteries of 4″/50 caliber ex-Navy guns were emplaced on the North Shore of Oahu in 1942. They seem to have been withdrawn in 1943 as other defenses were constructed. It is not clear who operated these guns; likely possibilities include the United States Army Coast Artillery Corps, Marine defense battalions, or naval personnel. The batteries were at Kaena, Kalihi (Mokuoeo Island), Battery Dillingham at Mokuleia, and Kaneohe Bay.

UK service
Many Mark 9 guns were supplied to the United Kingdom during World War II as part of Lend-lease, both individually and on naval and merchant ships. Caldwell, Wickes, and Clemson-class destroyers transferred under the Destroyers for Bases Agreement became British and Canadian s.

See also
List of naval guns
Deck gun

Weapons of comparable role, performance and era
 QF 4-inch naval gun Mk IV: British equivalent
 10.5 cm SK L/45 naval gun: German equivalent

Notes

References

 
 
 DiGiulian, Tony, United States of America 4″/50 (10.2 cm) Marks 7, 8, 9 and 10 at Navweaps.com
 
 
 Gardiner, Robert and Gray, Randal, Conway's All the World's Fighting Ships 1906-1921 Conway Maritime Press, 1985. .

External links

 List of all US coastal forts and batteries at the Coast Defense Study Group, Inc. website
 FortWiki, lists most CONUS and Canadian forts

World War II naval weapons
Naval guns of the United States
100 mm artillery